The  is a comparatively small medieval sect of Buddhism in Japan that arose in the Kamakura period as an offshoot of Shingon Buddhism. Its founder was a monk named Eison (叡尊 1201-1290), a disciple of Jōkei, and carried further by Eison's disciple Ninshō (忍性 1217-1303). 

Shingon Risshū is marked by a greater emphasis on the vinaya than traditional Shingon Buddhism while still adhering to tantric practices. Its home temple is Saidai-ji.

References
 

Shingon Buddhism